Wei River (渭河 or 渭水) is a major river in western's China's Shaanxi and Gansu provinces and the largest tributary of the Yellow River.

Wei River may also refer to:
Wei River (Shandong and Henan) (卫河), a river in northern China's Shandong province and Henan Province and a tributary of the Hai River
Wei River (Xiang River) (沩水河 or 沩江 or 沩河), a small river in southern China's Hunan province and a tributary of the Xiang River
Wei River (Hebei),  a part of the Bohai Sea basin
Wei River (Hubei) (洈水), a river in central China's Hubei province

See also
Wei (disambiguation)
Weihe (disambiguation)